The Larne Gazette was a newspaper based in Larne, County Antrim, Northern Ireland. It was published by the Alpha Newspaper Group.

Sources
 http://www.britishpapers.co.uk/n-ireland/larne-gazette/

Publications established in 1994
Publications disestablished in 2011
Newspapers published in Northern Ireland
Mass media in County Antrim
Gazette
1994 establishments in Northern Ireland
2011 disestablishments in Northern Ireland